Ren Hiramoto (born 27 June 1998) is a Japanese mixed martial artist and former kickboxer, currently fighting in the featherweight division of Rizin FF. A professional competitor since 2015, he is the 2016 Krush and 2017 K-1 lightweight tournament runner-up.

Kickboxing career

Early career
Hiramoto made his professional debut against Yuki Ishikawa at K-1 World GP 2015 -60kg Championship Tournament on January 18, 2015. He won the fight by a first-round left hook knockout.

Hiramoto faced Yuki Izuka at K-1 World GP 2015 -55kg Championship Tournament on April 19, 2015. He won the fight by a first-round knockout.

Hiramoto faced Yohei Noguchi at K-1 World GP 2015 -70kg Championship Tournament on July 4, 2015. He won the fight by unanimous decision, with all three judges scoring the fight 30-25 in his favor. He scored two knockdowns in the first round: the first with a right straight, while the second was a standing knockdown due to a series of undefended strikes.

Hiramoto faced the one-time Krush lightweight title challenger Minoru Kimura at K-1 World GP 2015 Survival Wars on September 22, 2015. Kimura won the fight by unanimous decision, with scores of 30-27, 30-26 and 30-27. Hiramoto was knocked down with a left hook at the very end of the second round.

After suffering his first professional loss, Hiramoto fought Massaro Glunder at K-1 World GP 2015 The Championship on November 21, 2015. Hiramoto lost the closely contested bout by majority decision, with scores of 29-29, 30-28 and 30-29.

Title fights

Krush lightweight tournament
Hiramoto participated in the 2016 Krush Lightweight tournament, held to fill the vacant title, following Hideaki Yamazaki's move up to super lightweight. Hiramoto was scheduled to face Yoshiki Harada at Krush 62 on January 17, 2016 in the tournament quarterfinals. Hiramoto won the fight by a second-round knockout. He knocked Harada down with a right straight early in the second round, and quickly followed it up with a left hook. The referee decided to wave the fight off after the second knockdown.

Hiramoto faced Taito in the tournament semifinals, held at Krush 64 on March 20, 2016. Taito advanced to the semifinals with a third-round knockout of Taro Hayasaka. Hiramoto won the fight by a dominant unanimous decision, with scores of 30-26, 30-26 and 30-25. He scored the single knockdown of the fight in the second round, dropping Taito with a left hook.

Hiramoto faced Daizo Sasaki in the tournament finals, held at Krush 66 on June 12, 2016. Sasaki earned his place in the finals with decision victories against Hisaki Higashimoto and Takayuki Minamino. Hiramoto lost the tournament final by majority decision, with scores of 29-28, 29-29 and 29-28.

K-1 lightweight tournament
Hiramoto took part in the 2017 K-1 Lightweight World Grand Prix, held on February 25, 2017. He was scheduled to face the experienced Nak Muay Brice Delval in the tournament quarterfinals. Hiramoto won the closely contested bout by majority decision, with scores of 30-28, 29-29 and 29-28. Hiramoto faced the WMPF World Super Lightweight champion Gonnapar Weerasakreck in the tournament semifinals. Hiramoto knocked Gonnapar with a right straight at the 2:15 minute mark. He knocked Gonnapar down with a left hook at the 1:44 minute mark, after which the referee stopped the fight.

Hiramoto faced the Wu Lin Feng lightweight champion Wei Rui in the tournament finals. Rui advanced to the finals with a stoppage victory against Daizo Sasaki in the quarterfinals and a decision victory against Cristian Spetcu in the semifinals. Rui won the bout by split decision, with scores of 30-28, 30-29 and 28-29.

Later K-1 career
Hiramoto was scheduled to face Umar Paskhaev at -1 World GP 2017 Super Welterweight Championship Tournament on June 18, 2017. He won the fight by unanimous decision.

Hiramoto was scheduled to fight a rematch with Daizo Sasaki at K-1 World GP 2017 Heavyweight Championship Tournament on November 23, 2017. Sasaki won their first meeting, on June 12, 2016, by majority decision. Hiramoto won the rematch through by unanimous decision, with scores of 30-25, 30-26 and 30-26. Hiramoto knocked Sasaki down twice at the very end of the round, although he was unable to finish him.

Hiramoto was scheduled to face the three-time K-1 lightweight Grand Prix winner Kaew Weerasakreck at K-1 World GP 2018: K'FESTA.1 on March 21, 2018. He won the fight by a second-round knockout. Combat Press would later name his win against Kaew as their 2018 "Upset of the Year".

Hiramoto was scheduled to face Takahiro Ashida during the Bellator and Rizin cross-promotion event, Bellator & Rizin: Japan, on December 29, 2019. He won the fight by a first-round technical knockout. Subsequently, he retired from kickboxing in order to pursue a career in professional mixed martial arts.

Hiramoto was ranked as a top ten featherweight according to Combat Press from April 2018 until July 2020, when he transitioned to mixed martial arts, and signed with Rizin.

Mixed martial arts career
Hiramoto signed a contract with Rizin in June 2020, intending to compete in mixed martial arts. Hiramoto made his professional mixed martial arts debut against Kyohei Hagiwara at Rizin 26 on December 31, 2020. He lost the fight via ground and pound TKO in round 2.

Hiramoto headlined Rizin Landmark 2 against Chihiro Suzuki on March 6, 2022. He lost the bout via unanimous decision.

Hiramoto faced Hiroaki Suzuki in the co-main event of Rizin 36 on July 2, 2022. The bout was later promoted to main event status. Hiramoto won the fight by split decision.

Hiramoto faced Satoshi Yamasu in the main event of Rizin Landmark Vol.4 on November 6, 2022. He won the fight by unanimous decision.

Titles and accomplishments

Kickboxing
Amateur
 2009 Windy Super Fight -40kg Champion
 2010 KAMINARIMON -40kg Champion
 2010 Windy Super Fight -45kg Champion
 2010 M-1 Junior -45kg Champion
 2011 M-1 Junior -55kg Champion
 2013 J-NETWORK  A-League Welterweight Champion
 2014 K-1 Koshien Champion

Professional
K-1
 2017 K-1 World GP Lightweight Tournament Runner- Up

Boxing
 2010 JPBA All Japan U-15 Championship Winner

Awards
2018 Combat Press "Upset of the Year" vs.  Kaew Weerasakreck  
eFight.jp Fighter of the Month (November 2022)

Mixed martial arts record

|-
|Win
|align=center| 2–2
|Satoshi Yamasu
|Decision (unanimous)
|Rizin Landmark 4
|
|align=center|3
|align=center|5:00
|Nagoya, Japan
|
|-
| Win
|align=center| 1–2
|Hiroaki Suzuki
|Decision (split)
|Rizin 36
|
|align=center|3
|align=center|5:00
|Okinawa, Japan
|
|-
|  Loss
| align=center| 0–2
| Chihiro Suzuki
| Decision (unanimous)
| Rizin Landmark 2
| 
| align=center|3
| align=center|5:00
| Fukuroi, Japan
|
|-
| 
| align=center| 0–1
| Kyohei Hagiwara
| TKO (corner stoppage)
| Rizin 26
| 
| align=center|2
| align=center|1:29
| Saitama, Japan
| 
|-

Kickboxing record

|-  style="text-align:center; background:#cfc;"
| 2019-12-29 ||Win || align=left| Takahiro Ashida || Bellator & Rizin: Japan || Saitama, Japan || TKO (Punches) || 1 || 
|- 
|-  style="text-align:center; background:#cfc;"
| 2018-03-21 || Win || align=left| Kaew Weerasakreck || K-1 World GP 2018: K'FESTA.1 || Saitama, Japan || KO (Punches) || 2 || 2:18
|- 
|-  style="text-align:center; background:#cfc;"
| 2017-11-23|| Win || align=left| Daizo Sasaki || K-1 World GP 2017 Heavyweight Championship Tournament|| Saitama, Japan || Decision (Unanimous) || 3 || 3:00
|- 
|-  style="text-align:center; background:#cfc;"
| 2017-06-18|| Win || align=left| Umar Paskhaev || K-1 World GP 2017 Super Welterweight Championship Tournament|| Saitama, Japan || Decision (Unanimous) || 3 || 3:00
|-  style="text-align:center; background:#Fbb;"
| 2017-02-25|| Loss || align=left| Wei Rui || K-1 World GP 2017 Lightweight Championship Tournament, Final || Tokyo, Japan || Decision (Split) || 3 || 3:00
|- 
! style=background:white colspan=9 |For the inaugural K-1 Lightweight Championship and World Grand Prix title.
|-  style="text-align:center; background:#cfc;"
| 2017-02-25|| Win|| align=left| Kongnapa Weerasakreck || K-1 World GP 2017 Lightweight Championship Tournament, Semi Finals || Tokyo, Japan || KO (Left Cross) || 1 || 1:14
|-  style="text-align:center; background:#cfc;"
| 2017-02-25|| Win|| align=left| Brice Delval || K-1 World GP 2017 Lightweight Championship Tournament, Quarter Finals || Tokyo, Japan || Decision (Majority) || 3 || 3:00
|-  style="text-align:center; background:#Fbb;"
| 2016-06-12|| Loss || align=left| Daizo Sasaki || Krush 66: -63kg Tournament, Final || Tokyo, Japan || Decision (Majority) || 3 || 3:00
|- 
! style=background:white colspan=9 |For the Krush Lightweight Title.
|-  style="text-align:center; background:#cfc;"
| 2016-03-20|| Win|| align=left| Taito || Krush 64: -63kg Tournament, Semi Finals || Tokyo, Japan || Decision (Unanimous)|| 3 || 3:00
|-  style="text-align:center; background:#cfc;"
| 2016-01-17|| Win|| align=left| Yoshiki Harada || Krush 62: -63kg Tournament, Quarter Finals || Tokyo, Japan || KO (Left Hook) || 2 || 1:11
|-
|-  style="text-align:center; background:#Fbb;"
| 2015-11-21|| Loss ||align=left| Massaro Glunder || K-1 World GP 2015 The Championship || Tokyo, Japan ||  Decision (Majority)|| 3 || 3:00
|-
|-  style="text-align:center; background:#Fbb;"
| 2015-09-22|| Loss||align=left| Minoru Kimura ||K-1 World GP 2015 Survival Wars || Tokyo, Japan|| Decision (unanimous) || 3 || 3:00
|- 
|-  style="text-align:center; background:#cfc;"
| 2015-07-04|| Win || align=left| Yohei Noguchi  || K-1 World GP 2015 -70kg Championship Tournament || Tokyo, Japan || Decision (Unanimous) || 3 || 3:00
|- 
|-  style="text-align:center; background:#cfc;"
| 2015-04-19|| Win || align=left| Yuki Izuka  || K-1 World GP 2015 -55kg Championship Tournament || Tokyo, Japan || TKO (Referee Stoppage/Right Hook) || 1 || 1:40
|- 
|-  style="text-align:center; background:#cfc;"
| 2015-01-18|| Win || align=left| Yuki Ishikawa||K-1 World GP 2015 -60kg Championship Tournament || Tokyo, Japan || KO (Left Hook) || 1 || 1:25
|-
| colspan=9 | Legend:    

|- 
|-  style="background:#cfc;"
| 2014-11-03|| Win || align=left| Tenma Sano || K-1 World GP 2014 -65kg Championship Tournament || Tokyo, Japan ||  Decision (Unanimous) || 3 || 3:00
|- 
! style=background:white colspan=9 |
|-  style="background:#cfc;"
| 2014-07-21|| Win || align=left| Yuto Shinohara || K-1 Koshien 2014 Tournament, Semi Final || Tokyo, Japan || Ext.R Decision (Split) || 2 ||2:00
|-  style="background:#cfc;"
| 2014-07-21|| Win || align=left| Tatsuki Kaneda || K-1 Koshien 2014 Tournament, Quarter Final || Tokyo, Japan || Decision (Unanimous)|| 1 ||2:00
|-  style="background:#cfc;"
| 2014-07-21|| Win || align=left| Kosuke Morii || K-1 Koshien 2014 Tournament, Second Round || Tokyo, Japan || Decision (Unanimous)|| 1 ||2:00
|-  style="background:#cfc;"
| 2014-07-21|| Win || align=left| Taio Asahisa || K-1 Koshien 2014 Tournament, First Round || Tokyo, Japan || Decision (Unanimous) || 1 ||2:00
|-  style="background:#cfc;"
| 2013-06-23|| Win || align=left| Daichi Noto || J-Grow || Tokyo, Japan || Decision ||2  ||2:00
|-  style="background:#cfc;"
| 2013-03-24|| Win || align=left| Moichi Tsuchiya || J-Network || Tokyo, Japan || KO ||  ||
|-  style="background:#cfc;"
| 2012-12-23|| Win || align=left| Tsubaki || Ora Ora 1 || Tokyo, Japan || Decision || 3 ||1:30
|-  style="background:#FFBBBB;"
| 2011-09-11|| Loss || align=left| Kaito Ono || 2011 M-1 Freshmans vol.3 - M-1 vs NEXT LEVEL Unification || Tokyo, Japan || Decision (Majority)|| 3 ||2:00
|-  style="background:#cfc;"
| 2011-08-28|| Win|| align=left| KAZUKI || M-1 Muay Thai Amateur 45|| Tokyo, Japan || Decision || 3 ||2:00
|- 
! style=background:white colspan=9 |
|-  style="background:#FFBBBB;"
| 2011-04-24|| Loss || align=left| Eisaku Ogasawara || REBELS.7 || Tokyo, Japan || Decision || 3 ||2:00
|-  style="background:#cfc;"
| 2011-08-28|| Win|| align=left| HPS || M-1 FAIRTEX SINGHA BEER || Tokyo, Japan || Decision || 3 ||2:00
|-  style="background:#cfc;"
| 2011-07-31|| Win|| align=left| Shunsei ||M-1 Muay Thai Amateur 44 || Tokyo, Japan || Decision  || ||
|-  style="background:#cfc;"
| 2010-12-12|| Win || align=left|  || M-1 Amateur Muay Thai 39|| Tokyo, Japan || Forfeit ||  ||
|- 
! style=background:white colspan=9 |
|-  style="background:#cfc;"
| 2010-10-31|| Win || align=left| Ryo Kubota || M-1 Amateur Muay Thai 38|| Tokyo, Japan || Decision (Unanimous) || 3 ||2:00
|- 
! style=background:white colspan=9 |
|-  style="background:#cfc;"
| 2010-10-02|| Win || align=left| Tenshin Nasukawa ||New ☆ square jungle|| Tokyo, Japan || Decision || 3 ||2:00
|-  style="background:#cfc;"
| 2010-09-19|| Win || align=left| Sho Yamaura || Muay Thai WINDY Super Fight vol.4 || Tokyo, Japan || Decision ||  ||
|- 
! style=background:white colspan=9 |
|-  style="background:#cfc;"
| 2010-07-18|| Win || align=left| Taisuke Ohno || A-League Tournament, Final|| Tokyo, Japan || Decision || 3 ||2:00
|-  style="background:#cfc;"
| 2010-06-13|| Win || align=left| || Muay Thai WINDY Super Fight vol.4 || Tokyo, Japan || Forfeit ||  ||
|- 
! style=background:white colspan=9 |
|-  style="background:#cfc;"
| 2010-03-14|| Win || align=left| Taisuke Ohno || Muay Thai WINDY Super Fight vol.2 || Tokyo, Japan || Decision  || 2 ||2:00
|- 
! style=background:white colspan=9 |
|-  style="background:#cfc;"
| 2010-01-24|| Win || align=left| Mizuki Ohtaka || KAMINARIMON || Tokyo, Japan || Decision || 3 ||2:00
|- 
! style=background:white colspan=9 |
|-  style="background:#fbb;"
| 2009-12-13|| Loss|| align=left| Seira Aragaki || M-1 Muay Thai Amateur 30 - M-1 Kid's Champion Carnival '09|| Tokyo, Japan || Decision  ||  ||
|- 
! style=background:white colspan=9 |
|-  style="background:#cfc;"
| 2009-12-06|| Win || align=left| Tatsuya Sakakibara || Muay Thai WINDY Super Fight vol.1 || Tokyo, Japan || Decision (Split) || 2 ||2:00
|- 
! style=background:white colspan=9 |
|-  style="background:#cfc;"
| 2009-10-25|| Win || align=left| Kaito Hayashi || KAMINARIMON || Tokyo, Japan || Decision (Unanimous) ||  ||
|-
| colspan=9 | Legend:

Exhibition record

|-
|Win
|align=center|1–0
|Genji Umeno
|KO (left hook)
|Bellator MMA vs. Rizin
|
|align=center|2
|align=center|3:00
|Tokyo, Japan
|Special standing bout. Boxing rules with spinning back fist allowed.

See also
 List of male kickboxers
 List of male mixed martial artists

References

Living people
1998 births
Japanese male kickboxers
Japanese male mixed martial artists
Mixed martial artists utilizing boxing
Mixed martial artists utilizing kickboxing
Featherweight kickboxers
Japanese male boxers
Sportspeople from Tokyo
Japanese YouTubers